CBTV is a Thames TV magazine programme for younger viewers, broadcast over four series in the 1980s.

Its main presenters were the comedy duo Jim Sweeney & Steve Steen, who at the start of each show would have to sneak past the security guard (played by Harry Fielder) on the gates of Teddington Studios to get to their rooftop studio. Other presenters on the show included Anneka Rice, Paul Henley and Mike Smith.

Transmission guide
Series 1: 26 editions from 5 January 1982 – 13 July 1982
Series 2: 43 editions from 28 September 1982 – 26 July 1983
Series 3: 44 editions from 6 September 1983 – 10 July 1984
Series 4: 24 editions from 16 October 1984 – 9 April 1985

References

External links
  

ITV children's television shows
Television shows produced by Thames Television
Television series by Fremantle (company)
Television shows shot at Teddington Studios